Bronwen Hughes is a Canadian film director. She was born in Toronto and is of Welsh descent. A graduate of the Department of Film, York University, she has directed commercials and feature films.

Filmography

Films

Television

Music videos

 Silk - "Freak Me" (1993)
 Amy Grant - "Lucky One" (1994)

Awards
25th Genie Award (2005): nominated for Best Achievement in Direction for Stander

References

External links

Film producers from Ontario
Canadian television directors
Canadian women film directors
Canadian women film producers
Canadian women screenwriters
Film directors from Toronto
Living people
Canadian women television directors
Writers from Toronto
Year of birth missing (living people)
Canadian music video directors
Television commercial directors